Out of the Silence is a 1919 novel by Erle Cox.

Out of the Silence may also refer to:
Out of the Silence (James novel), a 2005 novel by Wendy James
Out of the Silence (album), a 1988 album by Dare

See also
 Out of the Silent Planet (disambiguation)